The American Historical Association (AHA) is the oldest professional association of historians in the United States and the largest such organization in the world. Founded in 1884, the AHA works to protect academic freedom, develop professional standards, and support scholarship and innovative teaching. It publishes The American Historical Review four times a year, with scholarly articles and book reviews. The AHA is the major organization for historians working in the United States, while the Organization of American Historians is the major organization for historians who study and teach about the United States.

The group received a congressional charter in 1889, establishing it "for the promotion of historical studies, the collection and preservation of historical manuscripts, and for kindred purposes in the interest of American history, and of history in America."

Current activities 
As an umbrella organization for the discipline, the AHA works with other major historical organizations and acts as a public advocate for the field.  Within the profession, the association defines ethical behavior and best practices, particularly through its "Statement on Standards of Professional Conduct". The AHA also develops standards for good practice in teaching and history textbooks, but these have limited influence. The association generally works to influence history policy through the National Coalition for History.

The association publishes The American Historical Review, a major journal of history scholarship covering all historical topics since ancient history  and Perspectives on History, the monthly news magazine of the profession. In 2006 the AHA started a blog focused on the latest happenings in the broad discipline of history and the professional practice of the craft that draws on the staff, research, and activities of the AHA.

The association's annual meeting each January brings together more than 5,000 historians from around the United States to discuss the latest research and discuss how to be better historians and teachers. Many affiliated historical societies hold their annual meetings simultaneously. The association's web site offers extensive information on the current state of the profession, tips on history careers, and an extensive archive of historical materials (including the G.I. Roundtable series), a series of pamphlets prepared for the War Department in World War II.

The association also administers two major fellowships, 24 book prizes, and a number of small research grants.

History 

The early leaders of the association were mostly gentlemen with the leisure and means to write many of the great 19th-century works of history, such as George Bancroft, Justin Winsor, and James Ford Rhodes. However, as former AHA president  James J. Sheehan points out, the association always tried to serve multiple constituencies, "including archivists, members of state and local historical societies, teachers, and amateur historians, who looked to it - and not always with success or satisfaction - for representation and support."  Much of the early work of the association focused on establishing a common sense of purpose and gathering the materials of research through its Historical Manuscripts and Public Archives Commissions.

Publication standards 
From the beginning, the association was largely managed by historians employed at colleges and universities, and served a critical role in defining their interests as a profession.  The association's first president, Andrew Dickson White, was president of Cornell University, and its first secretary, Herbert Baxter Adams, established one of the first history Ph.D. programs to follow the new German seminary method at Johns Hopkins University. The clearest expression of this academic impulse in history came in the development of the American Historical Review in 1895. Formed by historians at a number of the most important universities in the United States, it followed the model of European history journals. Under the early editorship of J. Franklin Jameson, the Review published several long scholarly articles every issue, only after they had been vetted by scholars and approved by the editor. Each issue also reviewed a number of history books for their conformity to the new professional norms and scholarly standards that were taught at leading graduate schools to Ph.D. candidates. From the AHR, Sheehan concludes, "a junior scholar learned what it meant to be a historian of a certain sort".

AHA and public history 
Meringolo (2004) compares academic and public history. Unlike academic history, public history is typically a collaborative effort, does not necessarily rely on primary research, is more democratic in participation, and does not aspire to absolute "scientific" objectivity. Historical museums, documentary editing, heritage movements and historical preservation are considered public history. Though activities now associated with public history originated in the AHA, these activities separated out in the 1930s due to differences in methodology, focus, and purpose. The foundations of public history were laid on the middle ground between academic history and the public audience by National Park Service administrators during the 1920s-30s.

The academicians insisted on a perspective that looked beyond particular localities to a larger national and international perspective, and that in practice it should be done along modern and scientific lines.  To that end, the association actively promoted excellence in the area of research, the association published a series of annual reports through the Smithsonian Institution and adopted the American Historical Review in 1898 to provide early outlets for this new brand of professional scholarship.

Establishing a national history curriculum
In 1896 the association appointed a "Committee of Seven" to develop a national standard for college admission requirements in the field of history. Before this time, individual colleges defined their own entrance requirements. After substantial surveys of prevailing teaching methods, emphases and curricula in secondary schools, the Committee published "The Study of History in Schools" in 1898. Their report largely defined the way history would be taught at the high school level as a preparation for college, and wrestled with issues about how the field should relate to the other social studies. The Committee recommended four blocks of Western history, to be taught in chronological order—ancient, medieval and modern European, English, and American history and civil government—and advised that teachers "tell a story" and "bring out dramatic aspects" to make history come alive.[T]he student who is taught to consider political subjects in school, who is led to look at matters historically, has some mental equipment for a comprehension of the political and social problems that will confront him in everyday life, and has received practical preparation for social adaptation and for forceful participation in civic activities.... The pupil should see the growth of the institutions which surround him; he should see the work of men; he should study the living concrete facts of the past; he should know of nations that have risen and fallen; he should see tyranny, vulgarity, greed, benevolence, patriotism, self-sacrifice, brought out in the lives and works of men. So strongly has this very thought taken hold of writers of civil government, that they no longer content themselves with a description of the government as it is, but describe at considerable length the origin and development of the institutions of which they speak. 

The association also played a decisive role in lobbying the federal government to preserve and protect its own documents and records. After extensive lobbying by AHA Secretary Waldo Leland and Jameson, Congress established the National Archives and Records Administration in 1934.

As the interests of historians in colleges and universities gained prominence in the association, other areas and activities tended to fall by the wayside. The Manuscripts and Public Archives Commissions were abandoned in the 1930s, while projects related to original research and the publication of scholarship gained ever-greater prominence.

Recent developments 
In recent years, the association has tried to come to terms with the growing public history movement and has struggled to maintain its status as a leader among academic historians.

The association started to investigate cases of professional misconduct in 1987, but ceased the effort in 2005 "because it has proven to be ineffective for responding to misconduct in the historical profession."

Recent presidents 
2013: Kenneth Pomeranz (Univ. of Chicago)
2016: Patrick Manning (University of Pittsburgh)
2017: Tyler Stovall (University of California, Santa Cruz)
2018: Mary Beth Norton (Cornell University)
2019: J. R. McNeill (Georgetown University)
2020: Mary Lindemann (University of Miami)
2021: Jacqueline Jones (University of Texas at Austin)
2022:  (University of Wisconsin-Madison)
2023: Edward Muir (Northwestern University), elect

Selected awards

for publications
Herbert Baxter Adams Prize for the best book in European history
George Louis Beer Prize for the best book in European international history since 1895
Jerry Bentley Prize for the most outstanding book on world history
Albert J. Beveridge Award in American history for a distinguished book on the history of the United States, Latin America, or Canada, from 1492 to the present
Paul Birdsall Prize for a major book on European military and strategic history since 1870
James Henry Breasted Prize for the best book in any field of history prior to AD 1000
John H. Dunning Prize for the most outstanding book on US history
John K. Fairbank Prize for the best book on East Asian history since 1800
Morris D. Forkosch Prize for the best book in the field of British history since 1485
Leo Gershoy Award for the best book in the fields of 17th and 18th-century western European history
Friedrich Katz Prize for the best book in Latin American and Caribbean history
James A. Rawley Prize for the best book that explores the integration of Atlantic worlds before the 20th century

for professional distinction
James Harvey Robinson Prize for the teaching aid that has made the most outstanding contribution to the teaching and learning of history in any field
Herbert Feis Award for distinguished contributions to public history
Award for Scholarly Distinction to senior historians for lifetime achievement
 Martin A. Klein Prize instituted in his name for the most distinguished work of scholarship on African history published in English during the previous calendar year

Past presidents
Presidents of the AHA are elected annually and give a president's address at the annual meeting:

 Andrew Dickson White (1884, 1885)
 George Bancroft (1886)
 Justin Winsor (1887)
 William Frederick Poole (1888)
 Charles Kendall Adams (1889)
 John Jay (1890)
 William Wirt Henry (1891)
 James Burrill Angell (1892–1893)
 Henry Adams (1893–1894)
 George Frisbie Hoar (1895)
 Richard Salter Storrs (1896)
 James Schouler (1897)
 George Park Fisher (1898)
 James Ford Rhodes (1899)
 Edward Eggleston (1900)
 Charles Francis Adams, Jr. (1901)
 Alfred Thayer Mahan (1902)
 Henry Charles Lea (1903)
 Goldwin Smith (1904)
 John Bach McMaster (1905)
 Simeon E. Baldwin (1906)
 J. Franklin Jameson (1907)
 George Burton Adams (1908)
 Albert Bushnell Hart (1909)
 Frederick Jackson Turner (1910)
 William Milligan Sloane (1911)
 Theodore Roosevelt (1912)
 William A. Dunning (1913)
 Andrew C. McLaughlin (1914)
 H. Morse Stephens (1915)
 George Lincoln Burr (1916)
 Worthington C. Ford (1917)
 William R. Thayer (1918–1919)
 Edward Channing (1920)
 Jean Jules Jusserand (1921)
 Charles H. Haskins (1922)
 Edward P. Cheyney (1923)
 Woodrow Wilson (1924, died before completing his term as president)
 Charles M. Andrews (1924, 1925)
 Dana C. Munro (1926)
 Henry Osborn Taylor (1927)
 James H. Breasted (1928)
 James Harvey Robinson (1929)
 Evarts Boutell Greene (1930)
 Carl Lotus Becker (1931)
 Herbert Eugene Bolton (1932)
 Charles A. Beard (1933)
 William E. Dodd (1934)
 Michael I. Rostovtzeff (1935)
 Charles McIlwain (1936)
 Guy Stanton Ford (1937)
 Laurence M. Larson (1938)
 William Scott Ferguson (1939)
 Max Farrand (1940)
 James Westfall Thompson (1941)
 Arthur M. Schlesinger (1942)
 Nellie Neilson (1943)
 William L. Westermann (1944)
 Carlton J. H. Hayes (1945)
 Sidney B. Fay (1946)
 Thomas J. Wertenbaker (1947)
 Kenneth Scott Latourette (1948)
 Conyers Read (1949)
 Samuel E. Morison (1950)
 Robert Livingston Schuyler (1951)
 James G. Randall (1952)
 Louis Gottschalk (1953)
 Merle Curti (1954)
 Lynn Thorndike (1955)
 Dexter Perkins (1956)
 William L. Langer (1957)
 Walter Prescott Webb (1958)
 Allan Nevins (1959)
 Bernadotte E. Schmitt (1960)
 Samuel Flagg Bemis (1961)
 Carl Bridenbaugh (1962)
 Crane Brinton (1963)
 Julian P. Boyd (1964)
 Frederic C. Lane (1965)
 Roy F. Nichols (1966)
 Hajo Holborn (1967)
 John K. Fairbank (1968)
 C. Vann Woodward (1969)
 R. R. Palmer (1970)
 David M. Potter (1971, died before completing his term as president)
 Joseph R. Strayer (1971)
 Thomas C. Cochran (1972)
 Lynn Townsend White, Jr. (1973)
 Lewis Hanke (1974)
 Gordon Wright (1975)
 Richard B. Morris (1976)
 Charles Gibson (1977)
 William J. Bouwsma (1978)
 John Hope Franklin (1979)
 David H. Pinkney (1980)
 Bernard Bailyn (1981)
 Gordon A. Craig (1982)
 Philip D. Curtin (1983)
 Arthur S. Link (1984)
 William H. McNeill (1985)
 Carl N. Degler (1986)
 Natalie Zemon Davis (1987)
 Akira Iriye (1988)
 Louis R. Harlan (1989)
 David Herlihy (1990)
 William E. Leuchtenburg (1991)
 Frederic E. Wakeman Jr (1992)
 Louise A. Tilly (1993)
 Thomas C. Holt (1994)
 John H. Coatsworth (1995)
 Caroline Walker Bynum (1996)
 Joyce Appleby (1997)
 Joseph C. Miller (1998)
 Robert Darnton (1999)
 Eric Foner (2000)
 Wm. Roger Louis (2001)
 Lynn Hunt (2002)
 James M. McPherson (2003)
 Jonathan Spence (2004)
 James J. Sheehan (2005)
 Linda K. Kerber (2006)
 Barbara Weinstein (2007)
 Gabrielle M. Spiegel (2008)
 Laurel Thatcher Ulrich (2009)
 Barbara Metcalf (2010)
 Anthony Grafton (2011)
 William Cronon (2012)
 Kenneth Pomeranz (2013)
 Jan E. Goldstein (2014)
 Vicki L. Ruiz (2015)
 Patrick Manning (2016)
 Tyler Stovall (2017)
 Mary Beth Norton (2018)
 J. R. McNeill (2019)
 Mary Lindemann (2020)
 Jacqueline Jones (2021)

Affiliated societies
Alcohol and Drugs History Society
American Association for State and Local History
American Association for the History of Medicine
American Catholic Historical Association
American Jewish Historical Society
American Journalism Historians Association
American Society for Eighteenth-Century Studies
American Society for Environmental History
American Society for Legal History
American Society of Church History
Coordinating Council for Women in History
Conference on Latin American History
National Council on Public History
Oral History Association
Phi Alpha Theta
Radical History Review
Roy Rosenzweig Center for History and New Media
Peace History Society
Society for History in the Federal Government
Society for Medieval Feminist Scholarship
Society for Military History
Society of Architectural Historians
Swiss American Historical Society
World History Association

See also 
 Bibliographical Society of America
 List of American historians
 Organization of American Historians

References

Selected bibliography
 Alonso, Harriet Hyman. " Slammin' at the AHA." Rethinking History 2001 5(3): 441–446.  Fulltext in Ingenta and Ebsco. The theme of the 2001 annual meeting of the AHA, "Practices of Historical Narrative," attracted a variety of panels. The article traces one such panel from its conception to presentation. Taking the theme to heart, the panelists created a "slam" (or reading) of narrative histories written by experienced historians, a graduate student, and an undergraduate student, and then opened the session to readings from the audience.
 American Historical Association Committee on Graduate Education. "We Historians: the Golden Age and Beyond." Perspectives 2003 41(5): 18–22.  Surveys the state of the history profession in 2003 and points out that numerous career options exist for persons with a Ph.D. in history, although the traditional ideal of a university-level appointment for new Ph.D.s remains the primary goal of doctoral programs.
 Bender, Thomas, Katz, Philip; Palmer, Colin; and American Historical Association Committee on Graduate Education. The Education of Historians for the Twenty-First Century. U. of Illinois Press, 2004. 222 pp.
 Elizabeth Donnan and Leo F. Stock, eds. An Historian's World: Selections from the Correspondence of John Franklin Jameson, (1956). Jameson was AHR editor 1895–1901, 1905–1928
 Higham, John. History: Professional Scholarship in America. (1965, 2nd ed. 1989). 
 Meringolo, Denise D. "Capturing the Public Imagination: the Social and Professional Place of Public History." American Studies International 2004 42(2–3): 86–117.  Fulltext in Ebsco.
 Morey Rothberg and Jacqueline Goggin, eds., John Franklin Jameson and the Development of Humanistic Scholarship in America (3 vols., 1993–2001). 
 Novick, Peter. That Noble Dream: The "Objectivity Question" and the American Historical Profession. Cambridge: Cambridge University Press, 1988. 
 Orrill, Robert and Shapiro, Linn. "From Bold Beginnings to an Uncertain Future: the Discipline of History and History Education." American Historical Review 2005 110(3): 727–751.  Fulltext in History Cooperative, University of Chicago Press and  Ebsco. In challenging the reluctance of historians to join the national debate over teaching history in the schools, the authors argue that historians should remember the leading role that the profession once played in the making of school history. The AHA invented school history in the early 20th century and remained at the forefront of K–12 policymaking until just prior to World War II. However, it abandoned its long-standing activist stance and allowed school history to be submerged within the ill-defined, antidisciplinary domain of "social studies."
 Sheehan, James J. "The AHA and its Publics - Part I." Perspectives  2005 43(2): 5–7. 
 Stearns, Peter N.; Seixas, Peter; and Wineburg, Sam, ed.  Knowing, Teaching, and Learning History. New York U. Press, 2000. 576 pp. 
 Townsend, Robert B. History's Babel: Scholarship, Professionalization, and the Historical Enterprise in the United States, 1880–1940. Chicago: University Of Chicago Press, 2013. 
 Tyrrell, Ian. Historians in Public: The Practice of American History, 1890–1970. Chicago: University of Chicago Press, 2005.

External links

 
History organizations based in the United States
Professional associations based in the United States
Organizations established in 1884
Historical societies of the United States
Supraorganizations
Patriotic and national organizations chartered by the United States Congress
1884 establishments in the United States